Syzygium racemosum, the wax jambu, is a species of flowering plant in the family Myrtaceae. It is native to Thailand, Peninsular Malaysia, Java, the Lesser Sunda Islands, and Borneo. A tree reaching , it is occasionally harvested for its timber, and a black dye can be made from its bark.

Subtaxa
The following subspecies are accepted:
Syzygium racemosum subsp. calcimontanum  – Sarawak
Syzygium racemosum subsp. racemosum – Thailand, Malaya, Java, Lesser Sunda Islands, Borneo

References

racemosum
Flora of Thailand
Flora of Malaya
Flora of Java
Flora of the Lesser Sunda Islands
Flora of Borneo
Plants described in 1828